The 1934–35 St. Francis Terriers men's basketball team represented St. Francis College during the 1934–35 NCAA men's basketball season. The team was coached by Rody Cooney, who was in his third year at the helm of the St. Francis Terriers. The team was not part of a conference and played as division I independents. The Terriers played their home games at the Bulter Street Gymnasium in their Cobble Hill, Brooklyn campus.

The 1934–35 team finished with a .500 record at 12–12.

Roster

 

  

  

   

source

Schedule and results

|-
!colspan=12 style="background:#0038A8; border: 2px solid #CE1126;;color:#FFFFFF;"| Regular Season

   

  

  

  

  
    

  
|-

References

St. Francis Brooklyn Terriers men's basketball seasons
St. Francis
Saint Francis
Saint Francis